Thomas Robert Davis (born December 3, 1938) is an American former college men's basketball coach. He served as the head coach at Lafayette College, Boston College, Stanford University, the University of Iowa, and Drake University from 1971 to 2007.

Early life
A native of Ridgeway, Wisconsin, Davis attended the University of Wisconsin–Platteville, where he played on the basketball team as a point guard. He was interested in politics, and between his junior and senior years of college, held a congressional internship for Wisconsin state senator Alexander Wiley.

Coaching career
After graduating from UW–Platteville, at the age of 21, Davis took over as head coach at Milledgeville High School in Milledgeville, Illinois for the 1960–61 school year. He attempted to mimic the martinet coaching style of his own college mentor, John Barth, but concluded that "You have to be yourself. What works for someone else isn't going to work for you just because it worked for him."

From 1961 to 1966, Davis was head coach at Portage High School in Portage, Wisconsin. While there, he faced a dilemma in allotting playing time to his players, most of whom he believed were good enough to warrant it. Davis awarded playing time to all deserving players, which gave rise to his philosophy of constantly pressing and rotating players in an effort to wear down the opposing team.

Davis earned a master's degree from the University of Wisconsin–Madison. In 1967, Frank Fellows took over as head coach at the University of Maryland, and hired Davis onto his staff. While serving as an assistant at Maryland, Davis earned his doctorate in history.

Lafayette College
Davis began his coaching career at Lafayette College in 1971. During his six-year tenure at the school, he posted a 116–44 record, advancing to the NIT in 1972 and 1975. Future Maryland head coach Gary Williams, who had played as a point guard under Davis at Maryland, served as one of his assistants at Lafayette.

Boston College
In 1977, Davis became the head coach at Boston College.  The Eagles compiled a 100–47 record earning two trips to the NCAA Tournament and a trip to the NIT.

Stanford & Iowa
He would accept a position at Stanford University before taking over as the head coach at the University of Iowa in 1986. While at Iowa, he led the Hawkeyes to nine NCAA Tournaments, including a pair of Sweet Sixteen appearances as well as an Elite Eight. The Hawkeyes also made two NIT appearances. He is the winningest coach in the University of Iowa history.

His team was ranked number one during the 1986–87 season. The Hawkeyes won a school record thirty games before eventually being beaten in the Regional Final of the NCAA Tournament by UNLV 84–81.

On April 2, 1998, after Iowa lost in the first round of the NIT, Davis announced that he would resign after his contract would expire in the following season. Athletic director Bob Bowlsby notified Davis that he would not renew his contract. In Davis's final season, Iowa advanced to the Sweet 16 round of the NCAA tournament for the first time since 1988.

Drake University
Davis was named Drake University's 23rd head basketball coach on April 22, 2003. In four short seasons, Davis re-energized a Bulldog program that had not had a winning season since the 1985–86 season. He led Drake to a 17–15 record; including winning the Big Four Series, Drake Regency Challenge, and Sun Bowl Tournament.

Retirement
On March 21, 2007 Davis announced his retirement from college coaching. His son Keno Davis took over as head basketball coach at Drake University. Davis’ career included sixteen 20-win seasons, eighteen post season appearances, and he was named Associated Press National Coach of the Year in 1987. In 2008, he was inducted into the University of Iowa Athletics Hall of Fame for his success as a coach during his tenure there. He currently lives in the Iowa City area with his wife Shari.

Head coaching record

* Iowa's original 1995–96 record was 23–9 (11–7 Big Ten), but the NCAA awarded Iowa a win by forfeit for the January 3, 1996 game at Purdue, originally an 85–61 loss, due to NCAA violations by Purdue.

Notable players coached
Michael Adams
B. J. Armstrong
John Bagley
Greg Butler
Ryan Bowen
Matt Bullard
Ricky Davis
Acie Earl
Kevin Gamble
Ed Horton
Les Jepsen
Todd Lichti
Brad Lohaus
Roy Marble
Russ Millard
Chris Street
Adam Emmenecker
Dean Oliver

References

1938 births
Living people
American men's basketball players
Basketball coaches from Wisconsin
Basketball players from Wisconsin
Boston College Eagles men's basketball coaches
College men's basketball head coaches in the United States
Drake Bulldogs men's basketball coaches
Guards (basketball)
High school basketball coaches in Illinois
High school basketball coaches in Indiana
Iowa Hawkeyes men's basketball coaches
Maryland Terrapins men's basketball coaches
Stanford Cardinal men's basketball coaches
People from Ridgeway, Wisconsin
University of Maryland, College Park alumni
University of Wisconsin–Madison alumni
Wisconsin–Platteville Pioneers men's basketball players